ŠK Futura Humenné was a Slovak football team, based in the town of Humenné. During the Summer 2015, ŠK Futura sold their license to Svidník.

History
 1903 Founded as Homonnai Athlétikai Club (Hungarian). Humensky Atleticky Klub (Slovak).
 1920 Renamed HAC Humenné
 1948 Renamed Sokol Humenné
 1949 Renamed HAC Humenné
 1951 Renamed HAC CSZZ Humenné
 1952 Renamed CSZZ Humenné
 1953 Renamed DSO Tatran Humenné
 1959 Merged with Lokomotive Humenné and Chemko Humenné
 1967 Renamed TJ Chemko Humenné
 1968 Renamed TJ LCHZZ Humenné
 1973 Renamed TJ Chemlon Humenné
 1991 Renamed FC Chemlon Humenné
 1997 Renamed HFC Humenné
 2000 Renamed 1. HFC Humenné
 2012 Renamed ŠK Futura Humenné

Honours

Domestic
 1.SNL (1st Slovak National football league) (1969–1993)
  Winners (1): 1976-77
 Slovenský Pohár (Slovak Cup) (1961-)
  Winners (1): 1996

European competition history

Sponsorship

Notable players
Had international caps for their respective countries. Players whose name is listed in bold represented their countries while playing for Humenné.

For full list, see :Category:1. HFC Humenné players

	
 Juraj Buček
 Marián Čišovský
 Pavol Diňa
 Peter Dzúrik
	
 Dávid Guba
 Martin Koscelník
 Ján Mucha
 Martin Obšitník
	
 Dušan Sninský
 Anton Šoltis
 Vladislav Zvara

References

External links
 

Defunct football clubs in Slovakia
Association football clubs established in 1903
Association football clubs disestablished in 2015
1903 establishments in Slovakia
2015 disestablishments in Slovakia
Sport in Humenné